The 1999–2000 Lafayette Leopards men's basketball team represented Lafayette College during the 1999–2000 NCAA Division I men's basketball season. The Leopards, led by 5th year head coach Fran O'Hanlon, played their home games at the Kirby Sports Center and were members of the Patriot League. They finished the season 24–7, 11–1 in Patriot League play to finish tied for first place. They defeated Army, Lehigh, and Navy to win the Patriot League tournament to receive an automatic bid to the NCAA tournament. As No. 15 seed in the East region, they lost in the opening round to No. 2 seed Temple.

Roster

Schedule and results

|-
!colspan=9 style=| Regular Season

|-
!colspan=9 style=| Patriot League Tournament

|-
!colspan=9 style=| NCAA Tournament

 </ref>

Awards and honors
Brian Ehlers – Patriot League Player of the Year (2x)

References

Lafayette Leopards men's basketball seasons
Lafayette
Lafayette
Lafayette Leopards men's basketball team
Lafayette Leopards men's basketball team